Grégory Saint-Géniès (born 23 May 1977 in Maisons-Alfort) is a French skeleton racer who has competed since 2002. His best World Cup finish was 18th in the men's event twice (2005, 2009).

Saint-Géniès' best finish at the FIBT World Championships was 16th in the men's event at St. Moritz in 2007.

He competed at the 2010 Winter Olympics where he finished 15th.

External links
 
 
 

1977 births
Living people
People from Maisons-Alfort
French male skeleton racers
Olympic skeleton racers of France
Skeleton racers at the 2010 Winter Olympics
Sportspeople from Val-de-Marne